The Eagle Has Landed is a book by British writer Jack Higgins, set during World War II and first published in 1975.

It was quickly adapted into a British film of the same name, directed by John Sturges and released in 1976. It starred Michael Caine, Donald Sutherland, Jenny Agutter and Robert Duvall.

Plot
The book makes use of the false document technique, and opens with Higgins describing his discovery of the concealed grave of thirteen German paratroopers in an English graveyard. The characters discuss the historic rescue of Hitler's ally Benito Mussolini in September 1943. After Mussolini was deposed and imprisoned by the Italian government, Otto Skorzeny led a German team and achieved his release and escape from Italy. 

Adolf Hitler, with the strong support of Heinrich Himmler, considered a similar plan to kidnap the British Prime Minister Winston Churchill. Admiral Wilhelm Canaris, head of the Abwehr (German military intelligence), is ordered to make a feasibility study of capturing Churchill and taking him to the Reich. Canaris realises that although Hitler will soon forget the matter, Himmler will not. Fearing Himmler may try to discredit him, Canaris orders one of his officers, Oberst Radl, to undertake the study, despite feeling that it is all a waste of effort.

An Unteroffizier on Radl's staff finds that one of their spies, codenamed Starling, has provided a tantalising piece of intelligence. "At any other time, in any other place, this information would be useless," Radl said. "And then synchronicity rears its disturbing head."  Churchill is scheduled to spend a relaxing weekend at a country house near the village of Studley Constable, Norfolk, where Joanna Grey, an Afrikaner woman and longtime Abwehr agent, lives. She detests England because she was abused and raped by British soldiers, and her husband, daughter, and parents were killed during the Anglo-Boer War. As a result of her reports, Radl devises a detailed plan to intercept Churchill and transport him to Germany. Although Radl is certain the plan has real possibilities, Admiral Canaris orders him to abandon it.

Himmler, however, has already learned of the scheme and summons Radl. He orders him to proceed, but without informing Canaris. In response, Radl arranges for Liam Devlin, a member of the Irish Republican Army who served as an officer in the Lincoln Battalion in the Spanish Civil War, to be smuggled to Norfolk by way of Northern Ireland. Posing as a wounded veteran of the British Army, he contacts Mrs. Grey, who arranges a position for him as gamekeeper to the estate of Studley Grange. While awaiting further developments, Devlin becomes romantically involved with Molly Prior, a girl from the village.

Meanwhile, Radl selects the members of the "commando style" unit, to be led by disgraced Fallschirmjäger commander Lieutenant Colonel Kurt Steiner, which is supposed to carry out the operation. While returning from the Eastern Front, Steiner had intervened when SS soldiers were rounding up Jews at a railway station in Poland. To the outrage of the SS and Polizei, he took one of their men hostage and helped a teenage Jewish girl to escape on a passing freight train.  For this he was court-martialled, along with his men, who backed his actions. Too highly decorated to face a firing squad, Steiner and his men were allowed to transfer to a penal unit in the Channel Islands. There they are forced to make high-risk attacks with human torpedoes against Allied ships in the English Channel.

Radl travels to Alderney and recruits Steiner and his surviving men. Steiner's father, General Steiner, is being tortured by the Gestapo for his alleged ties to the German Resistance. This serves as an additional incentive for the Colonel to accept the mission. Radl relocates Steiner and his men to an airfield on the north western coast of Holland, where they familiarise themselves with the British weapons and equipment they will be using. The team will be air-dropped into Norfolk from a captured C-47 Dakota with Allied markings. The commandos outfit themselves as Free Polish troops, as few of them speak English; the plan is to infiltrate Studley Constable, capture Churchill, rendezvous with an E-boat at the nearby coast, and make their escape. As part of the ruse, they arm themselves with Sten guns, M1 Garands, Bren guns and revolvers, as well as Browning Hi-Powers, instead of German weaponry.

At first, the plan seems to go off without a hitch. But one of Steiner's NCOs rescues a young girl who fell into a mill race. He is killed by the water wheel and his German uniform (worn, by Himmler's order, under the Polish uniforms, as protection against being executed as spies) is seen by several of the villagers. Determined to continue the mission, Steiner arranges for the locals to be rounded up, but the sister of Father Vereker, the local priest, escapes and alerts a nearby unit of US Army Rangers. Colonel Robert Shafto, an inexperienced but glory-seeking officer, rallies his forces to retake the hostages. Without notifying headquarters, he orders a foolhardy assault in which many Americans are killed. After the Colonel is shot in the head by Mrs. Grey, Major Harry Kane, Shafto's Executive officer in the Rangers, organises a second, successful attack.

Steiner, his second-in-command Ritter von Neumann, and Devlin escape with Molly's aid. Determined to finish the mission, Steiner allows Devlin and Neumann to escape without him and decides to make one last attempt at Churchill. He succeeds in reaching Churchill, but hesitates, is shot and supposedly killed. (However, Steiner reappears alive in The Eagle Has Flown, a quasi-sequel.) In Germany, Radl has had a heart attack, implied to be fatal. At about the same time, Himmler, upon discovering that the mission has failed, orders Radl's arrest for high treason.

This account is surrounded by a frame story with a prologue and epilogue, a technique that Higgins uses in other of his novels. The author, whilst doing historical research in Norfolk, supposedly meets various surviving characters. Some paperback editions have more historical backstory than others, including a meeting with an older Liam Devlin in a Belfast hotel. The final revelation comes from an aged and terminally ill Father Vereker: at the time of his supposed visit to Norfolk, Churchill was en route to the Tehran Conference.  The "Churchill" whom Steiner nearly killed was an impersonator, meaning that even if Steiner had fatally shot the man, the government would not have been affected.

Characters
 Lt. Colonel Kurt Steiner – Steiner is a veteran of the Invasion of Norway, Albert Canal, the Battle of Crete, Leningrad, Stalingrad and the Ukraine.
 Liam Devlin – Based on IRA man Frank Ryan, who during the Second World War liaised with Germany to get money and weapons for the IRA. 
 Joanna Grey – A Boer South African Nazi sympathiser and Abwehr agent living in Studley Constable. Motivated to spy against Britain because her mother and sister died in a British Concentration Camp during the Boer War. Killed by American Ranger Jerzy Krukowski in November 1943.
 Molly Prior – A local girl who falls in love with Devlin with whom she later sleeps. (The film adaption omits much of this romance.)
 Harvey Preston – A SS British Free Corps officer attached to Steiner's unit to add credibility. A convinced Nazi, and a convicted con-man prior to his enlistment, Preston is viewed with disgust by Steiner, Devlin, and their fellow commandos. After Steiner, Neumannn, and Devlin escape, Preston is lynched inside the village's Roman Catholic Church by a mentally-ill resident of Studley Constable.
 Leutnant Ritter von Neumann – Steiner's second-in-command.
 Stabsfeldwebel Otto Brandt – Killed in action in Studley Constable in November, 1943.
 Feldwebel Hans Altmann – Killed in action in Studley Constable in November, 1943.
 Gefreiter Werner Briegel – Killed in action in Studley Constable in November, 1943.
 Paul Koenig – Commander of the German E-boat.
 Captain Peter Gericke – Pilot of the Douglas DC-3 that drops Steiner and his men over Norfolk.
  Major Harry Kane – Shafto's Executive officer in the US Army Rangers.

Publication details
 1975, US, Bantam Books 
1975, US, Holt, Rinehart and Winston

Reception
This book rapidly became a bestseller. As of 2010, it has sold more than 50 million copies.

Adaptation
The film rights were purchased and an adaptation was quickly prepared. In 1976, a British film of the same name was released, the last film directed by John Sturges. It starred Michael Caine, Donald Sutherland, Jenny Agutter, and Robert Duvall. Its success also stimulated more book sales.

Sequel
Higgins wrote a sequel called The Eagle Has Flown, which was published in 1991. It was also set during World War II.

Higgins featured his character of Liam Devlin in several later thrillers. He is older and acts as  a mentor to Sean Dillon and Martin Brosnan. In Higgins' novel Confessional (1985), Devlin allies with MI6 to prevent a rogue KGB assassin from murdering Pope John Paul II.

References

External links
 WW2DB: The Eagle Has Landed book review

1975 British novels
British novels adapted into films
Novels by Jack Higgins
Secret histories
William Collins, Sons books
Novels set during World War II
Novels set in England
Novels set in Norfolk